Caleta celebensis is a species of butterfly of the family Lycaenidae. It is found in southeastern Sulawesi.

References

Caleta (butterfly)
Butterflies of Indonesia
Taxa named by Otto Staudinger
Butterflies described in 1889